Khvorjal-e Bala (also Romanized as Khvorjāl-e Bālā) is a village in Fin Rural District, Fin District, Bandar Abbas County, Hormozgan Province, Iran. At the 2006 census, its population was 13, in 4 families.

References 

Populated places in Bandar Abbas County